, doing business as , is a Japanese commercial terrestrial television broadcasting company headquartered at 11-25 Miyako-chō 1-chōme, Chūō-ku, Chiba serving Chiba Prefecture but spill-over is received in the neighbouring prefectures. It is a member of the Japanese Association of Independent Television Stations (JAITS). It is often involved in UHF anime "production committee" projects chairing other stations. Most anime broadcasts are what are considered seinen anime.

Broadcasting modes, call signs and channels
 Analog: JOCL-TV Funabashi ch46 and other relay stations.
 Digital: JOCL-DTV Funabashi ch30, Chōshi ch30, and other stations.

History

Chiba Television Broadcasting was founded January 28, 1970 and officially began broadcasting May 1, 1971. Digital broadcast officially began April 4, 2006.

Programmes

News
 Asamaru Just
 BBC World News
 News Chiba 21

Sports
 Marines Night Game
 Kick-off J-league Kashiwa Reysol

Variety
 Shiro-Kuro UN-JASH
 Karaoke grand prize 21
 Karaoke trial II
 Asakusa ochanoma yose (Rakugo Stage)
 Being Inc.-produced programs (CTC is the key station.)
 Artist Request
 Music Focus

Past anime programs CTC broadcast

 07-Ghost
 Ai Yori Aoshi ~Enishi~
 Black Lagoon
 Bokura ga Ita
 Burn Up Scramble
 Canvas 2 ~Niji Iro no Sketch~
 Chocotto Sister
 Comic Party
 Coyote Ragtime Show
 D.C.: Da Capo
 D.C.S.S.: Da Capo Second Season
 Daphne in the Brilliant Blue
 DearS
 Dokyusei 2
 Elf ban Kakyuusei
 Fate/stay night
 Gargoyle of Yoshinaga House
 Girl's High
 Gravion Zwei
 Gunparade March
 Hakushaku to Yōsei
 Hanaukyo Maid Team: La Verite
 Happiness!
 Happy Seven
 Higurashi no Naku Koro ni
 Himawari!
 Hitohira
 Ikki Tousen
 Idolmaster: Xenoglossia
 Jessica obasan no jikenbo (Murder, She Wrote)
 Kakyuusei
 Kakyuusei 2
 Kannazuki no Miko
 Kimi ga Nozomu Eien Koi Suru Tenshi Angelique ~ Kokoro no Mezameru Toki ~ Kujibiki Unbalance Lucky Star Lamune Legend of Basara Lovedol ~Lovely Idol~ Magikano Mahou Shōjo Lyrical Nanoha A's Makai Senki Disgaea Mamotte! Lollipop Mezzo Midori Days Mouse Muteki Kanban Musume NHK ni Youkoso! Ninja Nonsense Noein - To Your Other Self Oku-sama wa Joshi Kousei Oku-sama wa Mahou Shōjo Otome wa Boku ni Koishiteru Petopeto-san Pumpkin Scissors Rakugo Tennyo Oyui Renkin 3-kyū Magical ? Pokān Shakugan no Shana Soul Link Special A Strawberry Panic! Sukisho Sugarbunnies Tactical Roar Tenbatsu Angel Rabbie The Melancholy of Haruhi Suzumiya To Heart Tona-Gura! Tsuyokiss Utawarerumono Ultimate Girls Wandaba Style Yoshimune Yume Tsukai Zero no Tsukaima''

See also
 Japanese Association of Independent Television Stations

References

External links
  
 

Anime companies
Companies based in Chiba Prefecture
Independent television stations in Japan
Television channels and stations established in 1971
Mass media in Chiba (city)